Lake Grace is a town in the eastern Wheatbelt region of Western Australia,  from Perth along State Route 107 between Wagin and Ravensthorpe. It is the main town in the Shire of Lake Grace. At the 2016 census, Lake Grace had a population of 507.

History
The area was first taken up for agriculture around 1911. In 1913 a school was established and named Lake Grace after the nearby lake. In 1914 the government planned to extend the railway network from Kukerin to Lake Grace, and local settlers lobbied for a townsite to be declared at the terminus. The railway was completed on 25 November 1916, and terminated close to the site of the existing school. The townsite of Lake Grace was gazetted later in 1916. The branch railway was extended to the ultimate terminus at Newdegate on 15 February 1926 and a further branch from Lake Grace to Hyden opened on 5 April 1933, making Lake Grace a junction and therefore of some importance for train working operations.

In 1922 the Reverend John Flynn visited the town to assess the suitability for establishing an Australian Inland Mission (AIM) hospital. The Western Australian Government agreed to subsidise the building of the hospital, which was subsequently built by AIM and opened in April 1926 staffed by two nurses, Olive Bennett and Helen Cousin. In July 1934 the Lake Grace Hospital Board repaid the loan from the Australian Inland Mission and took over the ownership of the hospital. The hospital served an area of  including providing maternity ward facilities. The hospital ceased operation in 1952 with the construction and replacement by the Lake Grace Memorial Hospital. The Lake Grace AIM Hospital building was in disrepair by 1983 with the state Government deciding to demolish the building. Protests by former staff and the local community halted the destruction, and the building was restored as a museum with the help of the Lake Grace Shire Council and the local community. 
The building is one of three remaining Australian Inland Mission hospitals and is listed on local, state and national heritage registers.
The lake after which the townsite was named was given the name Lake Grace by Marshall Fox, the District Surveyor, in 1910. It is named after Grace Brockman (née Bussell), the wife of the Surveyor General, Frederick Brockman. Grace had become famous in 1876 when she and the Bussell family's stockman Sam Isaacs rescued many people from the wreck of the  near the mouth of the Margaret River.

Present day
Lake Grace is located on the "cross roads" with it being half way between Perth and Esperance as well as acting as a main through point for those travelling between Albany and the Wheatbelt.  Many tourists use these alternative routes when travelling to and from the Eastern States.

The surrounding areas produce wheat and other cereal crops. The town is a receival site for Cooperative Bulk Handling.  Recently changes have included the development of the "Multi Art Space", the introduction of a visitor centre in the old station master's house and an improved townscape.  A range of economic developments are underway including a new residential sub-division and light industrial area.  There is also Living Towns Lake Grace where over 130 commercial enterprises are working together to improve the local economy.

Local artists have added a new dimension to the town.  The "Multi Art Space" allows local residents to learn and participate in key artistic projects.  Many of the artistic works are based on recycled materials such as plastic bags, aluminium cans and plastic bottle tops.  A number of local residents have become award winning artists including Kerrie Argent, who won the Cottesloe Sculpture by the Sea People's Choice Prize in 2010 for evidence – the trail continues.

The Lake Grace Visitor Centre open five days a week. The Visitor Centre is located in the old station master's house, which was restored by local residents in 2005. On display are local information guides, the history of Lake Grace, locally made products and a native seed bank.  Lake Grace is part of a region that contains the most diverse recognised flora in the world.

Locals played a key role in restoring the AIM hospital, now a museum that displays primary health care prior to 1960.

Lake Grace contains a district high school with distance learning available for years 11 and 12. There is a district hospital, a childcare centre and a medical centre with a doctor and other health services.

There are two banks in town: BankWest and Rabobank that opened in September 2009.  The shopping facilities include a local shopping forum with IGA supermarket, a butcher, health and beauty, hair dresser, clothing shop and two cafes. There is also a Retravision, CCL Hardware and resident electrical contractor and plumber. The town has a Community Pharmacy opened in 2014.

There is a range of recreational facilities available including a 50-metre pool, sporting complex including football, cricket, tennis, basketball and hockey.  The Sportsman's Club also has a synthetic bowling surface allowing bowls to be played all year round.  There is also a golf club and air strip.

Travellers' facilities include the local hotel-motel, roadhouse, the Salt Bush Inn motel and the Lake Grace Caravan Park. There is also a number of B&Bs in the area.

The local shire council is based in Lake Grace and there is a Community Resource Centre (telecentre).

The town is served three days per week by the Transwa Perth to Esperance bus service.

Geography

Climate
Lake Grace experiences a steppe climate (Köppen climate classification BSh).

Natural disasters
In late 2005 and early 2006, Lake Grace experienced two natural disasters. It was accompanied by about 60 mm of rainfall.

On 13 January 2006, the town was flooded by Cyclone Clare, receiving 230 mm of rainfall. It was declared a disaster zone by the State Government. Just over two weeks later, the town received another 30 mm of rain from Tropical Cyclone Emma. Large pumps were brought in to help dry out flooded roads, and the main highway to Perth was reopened six weeks later.

Lake Grace normally receives 353.3 mm of rainfall per annum with 16.3 mm in January.

Notable people
  Nat Fyfe, AFL 2015/2019 Brownlow Medalist, is from Lake Grace

References

External links
 Shire of Lake Grace

Towns in Western Australia
Grain receival points of Western Australia
Shire of Lake Grace